John Wilkinson was born in Norfolk, Virginia on November 6, 1821. He was a lieutenant and captain in the Confederate States Navy (CSN) during the American Civil War. For the CSS Robert E. Lee, he persuaded the owner in Scotland to sell it to the CSN for the same price that they had just bought her for. Wilkinson died on December 25, 1891, and is buried in Saint Anne's Cemetery in Annapolis, Maryland.

See also
 Blockade runners of the American Civil War

References

Bibliography
 Url1 Url2

1821 births
1891 deaths
Confederate States Navy captains
Blockade runners of the American Civil War
People of Virginia in the American Civil War